Donald Andrew Tannahill (born February 21, 1949, in Penetanguishene, Ontario) is a retired professional ice hockey player who played 222 games in the World Hockey Association (WHA) and 111 games in the National Hockey League (NHL). He played in the NHL for the Vancouver Canucks and in the WHA with the Minnesota Fighting Saints, and Calgary Cowboys. He also played for several minor league teams in a career that lasted from 1969 to 1978. Tannahill was selected third overall by the Boston Bruins in the 1969 NHL Amateur Draft, but never played for the Bruins.

Career statistics

External links 

1949 births
Boston Braves (AHL) players
Boston Bruins draft picks
Calgary Cowboys players
Canadian ice hockey forwards
Ice hockey people from Simcoe County
Living people
Minnesota Fighting Saints players
National Hockey League first-round draft picks
Niagara Falls Flyers (1960–1972) players
Oklahoma City Blazers (1965–1977) players
Salt Lake Golden Eagles (CHL) players
People from Penetanguishene
Vancouver Canucks players